The Men's 1 m springboard competition of the 2022 European Aquatics Championships was held on 18 August 2022.

Results

The preliminary round was started at 10:00. The final was held at 16:40. 

Green denotes finalists

References

Diving